The Wayans Bros. is an American sitcom that aired on The WB from January 11, 1995, to May 20, 1999, with 101 episodes produced spanning five seasons. The series starred Shawn and Marlon Wayans as brothers Shawn and Marlon Williams living in New York City.

Series overview

Episodes

Season 1 (1995)

Season 2 (1995–96)

Season 3 (1996–97)

Season 4 (1997–98)

Season 5 (1998–99)

References

External links 
 

Lists of American sitcom episodes